Jang Bahadur Singh Patel is an Indian politician. He was elected to the Lok Sabha, lower house of the Parliament of India from Phulpur, Uttar Pradesh as member of the Samajwadi Party.

References

External links
 Official biographical sketch in Parliament of India website

India MPs 1996–1997
India MPs 1998–1999
1947 births
Lok Sabha members from Uttar Pradesh
Samajwadi Party politicians
Living people
Bahujan Samaj Party politicians